Pavel Gennadevich Koltygin (born February 17, 1999) is a Russian professional ice hockey centre currently playing for SKA-Neva in the Supreme Hockey League (VHL) while under contract to SKA Saint Petersburg of the Kontinental Hockey League (KHL).

Playing career
Koltygin played as a youth in his native Russian within the Dynamo Moscow junior program. With NHL aspirations he was selected 9th overall in the 2016 CHL Import Draft by the Drummondville Voltigeurs of the Quebec Major Junior Hockey League (QMJHL).  

He spent three seasons in the QMJHL for the Drummondville Voltigeurs and was drafted in the sixth round, 176th overall, in the 2017 NHL Entry Draft by the Nashville Predators 

On 2 June 2019, Koltygin returned to Russia to begin his professional career in the Kontinental Hockey League, agreeing to a two-year contract with HC Vityaz. In his first full professional campaign in 2019–20, Koltygin made his debut in the KHL, going pointless through 28 regular season games. On 8 May 2020, Koltygin was traded by Vityaz to powerhouse club, SKA Saint Petersburg, in exchange for Nail Yakupov.

Career statistics

Regular season and playoffs

International

References

External links

1999 births
Living people
Drummondville Voltigeurs players
Nashville Predators draft picks
Russian ice hockey centres
Ice hockey people from Moscow
SKA Saint Petersburg players
SKA-Neva players
HC Vityaz players